This is a list of the Philippine national basketball team results. This list includes non-competitive matches against foreign teams.

2023

2022

2021

2020

2019

2018

2017

2016

2015

2014

2013

Notes

References